Nguyễn Thành Long Giang (born 6 September 1988 in Gò Công township, Tiền Giang, Vietnam) is a Vietnamese footballer. He is playing for Navibank Sài Gòn in Vietnamese Super League. He was called to Vietnam national under-23 football team at 2009 Southeast Asian Games.

References

External links 
 Nguyễn Thành Long Giang: SEA Games cuối đời, "rửa hận"

1988 births
Living people
Vietnamese footballers
Vietnam international footballers
Association football defenders
Navibank Sài Gòn FC players
Footballers at the 2010 Asian Games
Asian Games competitors for Vietnam